Sedgwick County (county code: SG) is located in the U.S. state of Kansas. As of the 2020 census, the population was 523,824, making it the second-most populous county in Kansas. Its county seat is Wichita, the most populous city in the state.

History

Early history

For many millennia, the Great Plains of North America was inhabited by nomadic Native Americans. From the 16th century to 18th century, the Kingdom of France claimed ownership of large parts of North America. In 1762, after the French and Indian War, France secretly ceded New France to Spain, per the Treaty of Fontainebleau. In 1802, Spain returned most of the land to France.

In 1803, most of the land for modern day Kansas was acquired by the United States from France as part of the 828,000 square mile Louisiana Purchase for 2.83 cents per acre. In 1848, after the Mexican–American War, the Treaty of Guadalupe Hidalgo with Spain brought into the United States all or part of land for ten future states, including southwest Kansas. In 1854, the Kansas Territory was organized, and in 1861 Kansas became the 34th U.S. state.

19th century

Sedgwick County was founded in 1867, and named after John Sedgwick, who was a major general in the Union Army during the American Civil War.

In 1887, the Chicago, Kansas and Nebraska Railway built a branch line north–south from Herington to Caldwell.  This branch line connected Herington, Lost Springs, Lincolnville, Antelope, Marion, Aulne, Peabody, Elbing, Whitewater, Furley, Kechi, Wichita, Peck, Corbin, Wellington, Caldwell.  By 1893, this branch line was incrementally built to Fort Worth, Texas.  This line is called the "OKT".  The Chicago, Kansas and Nebraska Railway was foreclosed in 1891 and was taken over by Chicago, Rock Island and Pacific Railway, which shut down in 1980 and reorganized as Oklahoma, Kansas and Texas Railroad, merged in 1988 with Missouri Pacific Railroad, and finally merged in 1997 with Union Pacific Railroad.  Most locals still refer to this railroad as the "Rock Island".

20th century
Sedgwick County was the setting for the murders committed by the BTK strangler from 1974 until 1991.  Dennis Rader, an employee of the Sedgwick County city of Park City was arrested in early 2005 after he began sending incriminating letters taunting the police in 2004. He had not been heard from since 1979. Ken Landwehr of the Wichita Police Department led the task force which captured Rader, setting a new standard of serial crime detection in the process, which is still studied by police departments across the world. Rader is serving 10 life sentences at the El Dorado Correctional Facility in El Dorado.

Geography

Adjacent counties
 Harvey County (north)
 Butler County (east)
 Cowley County (southeast)
 Sumner County (south)
 Kingman County (west)
 Reno County (northwest)

Demographics

Sedgwick County is part of the Wichita, KS Metropolitan Statistical Area.

As of the census of 2000, there were 452,869 people, 176,444 households, and 117,688 families residing in the county. There were 191,133 housing units at an average density of 191 per square mile (74/km2). The racial makeup of the county was 79.38% White, 9.13% Black or African American, 1.11% Native American, 3.34% Asian, 0.06% Pacific Islander, 4.17% from other races, and 2.81% from two or more races.  8.04% of the population were Hispanic or Latino of any race.

There were 176,444 households, out of which 34.40% had children under the age of 18 living with them, 51.70% were married couples living together, 10.90% had a female householder with no husband present, and 33.30% were non-families. 28.20% of all households were made up of individuals, and 8.70% had someone living alone who was 65 years of age or older.  The average household size was 2.53 and the average family size was 3.14.

In the county, the population was spread out, with 28.20% under the age of 18, 9.50% from 18 to 24, 30.30% from 25 to 44, 20.60% from 45 to 64, and 11.40% who were 65 years of age or older.  The median age was 34 years. For every 100 females, there were 97.80 males.  For every 100 females age 18 and over, there were 95.20 males.

The median income for a household in the county was $42,485, and the median income for a family was $51,645. Males had a median income of $37,770 versus $26,153 for females. The per capita income for the county was $20,907.  About 7.00% of families and 9.50% of the population were below the poverty line, including 11.90% of those under age 18 and 7.00% of those age 65 or over.

Economy
It is the birthplace of famous restaurants such as White Castle and Pizza Hut.  It is also the aviation headquarters of well-known Cessna and Learjet.

Government

Presidential elections

Sedgwick County is fairly conservative for an urban county. It has only gone Democratic in a presidential election once since 1944. Democratic strength is concentrated in Wichita, while the suburban areas are strongly Republican. However, the county often backs Democrats for governorship - most recently Laura Kelly in 2022. This makes it a bellwether in local Kansas elections, with the statewide winner almost always winning the county. The last Democratic Senate candidate to win the county was Bill Roy in 1974, while Kansas as a whole has not been represented by a Democrat in the Senate since 1938.

Laws
Sedgwick County was a prohibition, or "dry", county until the Kansas Constitution was amended in 1986 and voters approved the sale of alcoholic liquor by the individual drink with a 30 percent food sales requirement. The food sales requirement was removed with voter approval in 1988.

The county voted "No" on the 2022 Kansas Value Them Both Amendment, an anti-abortion ballot measure, by 58% to 42% despite backing Donald Trump with 54% of the vote to Joe Biden's 43% in the 2020 presidential election.

Transportation

Airports
The following public-use airports are located in Sedgwick County:
 Wichita Dwight D. Eisenhower National Airport (ICT)
 Beech Factory Airport (BEC)
 Cessna Aircraft Field (CEA)
 Colonel James Jabara Airport (AAO)
 Cook Airfield (K50)
 Maize Airport (70K)
 Westport Airport (71K)
 Westport Auxiliary Airport (72K)

The following are closed airports:
 Riverside Airport (K32)

Education

Colleges and universities
 Friends University
 Kansas College of Osteopathic Medicine
 Newman University
 University of Kansas School of Medicine
 WSU Tech
 Wichita State University

Unified school districts
 Wichita USD 259
 Derby USD 260
 Haysville USD 261
 Valley Center USD 262
 Mulvane USD 263
 Clearwater USD 264
 Goddard USD 265
 Maize USD 266
 Renwick USD 267
 Cheney USD 268

Points of interest
 Sedgwick County Extension Arboretum
 Sedgwick County Zoo
 Sedgwick County Fair
 Wichita-Sedgwick County Historical Museum
 INTRUST Bank Arena

Communities

Cities

 Andale 
 Bel Aire 
 Bentley 
 Cheney 
 Clearwater 
 Colwich 
 Derby 
 Eastborough 
 Garden Plain 
 Goddard 
 Haysville 
 Kechi 
 Maize 
 Mount Hope 
 Mulvane‡ 
 Park City 
 Sedgwick‡ 
 Valley Center 
 Viola 
 Wichita (county seat)

Unincorporated communities
† means a Census-Designated Place (CDP) by the United States Census Bureau.

 Anness
 Bayneville
 Clonmel
 Furley†
 Greenwich†
 McConnell AFB†
 Oaklawn-Sunview†
 Peck†‡
 Schulte
 St. Marks†
 Sunnydale
 Trails View (formerly Spasticville)

Ghost towns

 Davidson
 Hatfield
 Huckle
 Jamesburg
 Marshall
 Oatville
 Wichita Heights

Townships
Sedgwick County is divided into twenty-seven townships.  The cities of Bel Aire and Wichita are considered governmentally independent and are excluded from the census figures for the townships.  In the following table, the population center is the largest city (or cities) included in that township's population total, if it is of a significant size.  The county use to have one more township, Wichita Township, but it no longer exists.

See also
 National Register of Historic Places listings in Sedgwick County, Kansas
 Chisholm Trail

References

Notes

Further reading

 Wichita : Illustrated History 1868 to 1880; Eunice S. Chapter; 52 pages; 1914. (Download 3MB PDF eBook)
 History of Wichita and Sedgwick County Kansas : Past and present, including an account of the cities, towns, and villages of the county; 2 Volumes; O.H. Bentley; C.F. Cooper & Co; 454 / 479 pages; 1910. (Volume1 - Download 20MB PDF eBook),(Volume2 - Download 31MB PDF eBook)
 Standard Atlas of Sedgwick County, Kansas; Geo. A. Ogle & Co; 78 pages; 1905.
 Historical Atlas of Sedgwick County, Kansas; John P. Edwards; 50 pages; 1882.

External links

County
 
 Sedgwick County - Directory of Public Officials
Historical
 Wichita-Sedgwick County Historical Museum
Maps
 Sedgwick County Maps: Current, Historic, KDOT
 Kansas Highway Maps: Current, Historic, KDOT
 Kansas Railroad Maps: Current, 1996, 1915, KDOT and Kansas Historical Society

 
Kansas counties
1867 establishments in Kansas
Wichita, KS Metropolitan Statistical Area
Populated places established in 1867